Rudolf Steinbauer (born 9 September 1959) is a retired Austria international footballer and a football manager currently managing TSU Hafnerbach.

References

1959 births
Living people
Austrian footballers
Austria international footballers
Austrian football managers
Austrian Football Bundesliga players
Grazer AK players
SK Rapid Wien players
FC Swarovski Tirol players

Association football midfielders
People from Deutschlandsberg District
Footballers from Styria